Xiuying Fort (designation number: 6-1031) is located in Haikou City, Hainan Province, China. It was constructed in 1890 by the Qing government to counter the threat of the French. It was used to defend against the 1890 invasion by France, and in 1932 against the Japanese during the Cole attack.

It is assigned the designation number 6-1031.

See also
 Major national historical and cultural sites (Hainan)

References

External links

Major National Historical and Cultural Sites in Hainan
1800s establishments in China
Forts in China
Tourist attractions in Haikou